Fading Days is the debut EP from pop-punk band Amber Pacific.   The EP's title is mentioned in the song Everything We Were Has Become What We Are ("This is the last chapter of our fading days"), from Amber Pacific's album The Possibility and the Promise. Always You was later rerecorded and used on their debut album. The song "Always You" was featured on the soundtrack of the game Burnout 3: Takedown.

Track listing

References

2004 debut EPs
Amber Pacific albums
Albums produced by Martin Feveyear
Pop punk EPs
Hopeless Records EPs